Urophora cubana is a species of tephritid or fruit flies in the genus Urophora of the family Tephritidae.

Distribution
Cuba.

References

Urophora
Insects described in 1973
Diptera of North America